Palaeolemur is a genus of adapiform primate that lived in Europe during the late Eocene.

References

Literature cited

 

Prehistoric strepsirrhines
Eocene primates
Eocene mammals of Europe
Prehistoric primate genera
Fossil taxa described in 1873